The 2000 FA Trophy Final was the 31st final of The Football Association's cup competition for levels 5–8 of the English football league system. It was contested by Kettering Town and Kingstonian on 13 May 2000 at Wembley Stadium, London.

Kingstonian won the match 3-2, fighting back from 2-1 down to snatch a magnificent victory thanks to two goals from Eddie Akuamoah and the winner from Amara Simba. A crowd of 20,034 were in attendance.

Route to the final

Kettering Town

Kingstonian

Match

Details

References

FA Trophy Finals
FA Trophy Final
Kettering Town F.C. matches
Kingstonian F.C. matches
FA Trophy Final
Events at Wembley Stadium
FA Trophy Final